Karen W. Morgan (born May 2, 1952) is a Democratic politician from Utah. She was a member of the Utah State Senate representing the 8th District (portions of Salt Lake County) (map) from 2009 through 2013 and served as Minority Whip. Earlier (1998-2008) she was a member of the Utah House of Representatives from District 46.

In 2011 she founded the "Best Schools Coalition," which strives to make Utah's public education system the best in the nation. She is currently a Research Associate with the University of Utah Reading Clinic.

Personal
She was born in Ogden, Utah and attended the University of Utah, graduating with a B.S. in secondary education. She and her husband Baird are the parents of five grown sons.

References

External links
Project Vote Smart – Senator Karen Morgan (UT) profile
Follow the Money – Karen Morgan
2008 State Senate campaign contributions
2006 2004 2002 2000 1998 State House campaign contributions

1952 births
Living people
Politicians from Ogden, Utah
University of Utah alumni
Democratic Party Utah state senators
Democratic Party members of the Utah House of Representatives
Women state legislators in Utah
21st-century American politicians
21st-century American women politicians